Sergei Yurievich Trofimov (May 19, 1961 in Moscow, Russia) is a Russian cinematographer, known for his work with Timur Bekmambetov.

In 2008 he received the Nika Award for his work on the film Mongol.

Selected filmography
 Peshavar Waltz (1994)
 Night Watch (2004)
 Day Watch (2006)
 Mongol (2007)
 The Irony of Fate 2 (2007)
 Black Lightning (2009)
 Yolki (2010)
 Yolki 2 (2011)
 Yolki 3 (2013)
 Yolki 1914 (2014)
 August Eighth (2012)
 He's a Dragon (2015)
 Gogol. The Beginning (2017)
 The Last Warrior (2017)
 Trotsky (2017)

References

External links

1961 births
Russian cinematographers
Living people
Mass media people from Moscow